The Rial ARC1 was a Formula One racing car manufactured and raced by Rial Racing for the 1988 Formula One season. It was powered by a Cosworth DFZ V8 engine. Its best finish was at the 1988 United States Grand Prix when Andrea de Cesaris drove it to fourth place.

Development
Rial Racing was established by German industrialist Günter Schmid, who had previous experience of Formula One with ATS Racing, to participate in the 1988 season. He contracted former Ferrari engineer Gustav Brunner to design a car based around the Cosworth DFZ V8 engine. 

The car, designated the ARC1, was similar in appearance in Brunner's Ferrari F1/87 and was known as 'the Blue Ferrari', though the ARC1 featured a different engine cover owing to different sized engine and fuel tank, as well as lower sidepods than the Ferrari due to not having to house turbochargers. Brunner gave the car a unique front suspension arrangement with its dampers positioned longitudinally at the height of the floor. Rial also developed its own gearbox for the ARC1. A total of three cars were built.

Racing history
Rial Racing ran a single entry throughout the season for the experienced but erratic Italian Andrea de Cesaris who also brought much needed money to the team through his personal Marlboro sponsorship. For the season opening race in 1988 Brazilian Grand Prix, de Cesaris qualified 14th but retired during the race itself with engine trouble. At one stage, he was running in 6th place before he stopped for tires. De Cesaris had no problems qualifying the ARC1 for every race of the season and would regularly run in the midfield. Its best qualifying was 12th, achieved five times. 

Reliability though was poor and by the end of the season, he had only been classified in five races and even in two of these, he was not running at the finish due to running out of fuel (the ARC1 was known to have the smallest fuel tank of the atmospheric cars in 1988). However, one finish was fourth on the streets of Detroit where de Cesaris managed to stay out of trouble and quietly moved into the points as the crumbling track surface and the heat took its toll on the field. Finishing fourth in the last ever F1 race in Detroit earned the team three points.

Complete Formula One results
(key) (results in bold indicate pole position; results in italics indicate fastest lap) 

† classified but not running at finish

Notes

References

Rial Formula One cars